C&T may refer to:
 Catskill and Tannersville Railway, a former railway in New York state
 Chips and Technologies, a fabless semiconductor company
 Common-Civil-Calendar-and-Time, a proposal for calendar reform
 C&T Publishing